The Senate is the upper house of the Parliament of Ivory Coast. The Senate was created after a new constitution was approved by a referendum in 2016.

History
The Senate is expected to first sit in 2018, after the first Ivorian senatorial election, which will be held on March 24, 2018. Under the constitution the Senate is expected to represent the regions.

Electoral system
On February 14, 2018, the government of Ivory Coast decided the first Ivorian senatorial election will be held on March 24, 2018. It also established new rules on appointing senators, who will be elected by National Assembly members, members of municipal, autonomous districts and regional councils. Each region and autonomous district will have 2 senators elected and 1 appointed by the President. The Senate has 99 members, who serve five-year terms.

Presidents of the Senate

Below is a list of presidents of the Senate:

Current senators
On 24 March 2018, 66 senators were eletected. The president will appoint 33 senators.

References

Politics of Ivory Coast
Ivory Coast